The 2014–15 Gamma Ethniki was the 32nd season since the official establishment of the third tier of Greek football in 1983.
It started on 14 September 2014 and ended on 17 May 2015.

61 teams were separated into four groups, according to geographical criteria.

Thermaikos and A.O. Trikala 1963 withdrew from the league before the group draw.

Group 1

Teams

Standings

Group 2

Teams

note: A.O. Flamouli F.C. was actually EPS Trikala champion and winner of the 5th Group of the promotion play-offs but merged with Trikala on 12 July 2014

Standings

Group 3

Teams

Standings

Group 4

Teams

Standings

References

Third level Greek football league seasons
3
Greece